George "Barney" Mole (1879 – after 1901) was an English professional footballer who played as a winger. He played ten matches in the Football League for Newcastle United and Burnley.

References

1879 births
Year of death missing
Footballers from Stockton-on-Tees
Footballers from County Durham
English footballers
Association football outside forwards
Stockton St John's F.C. players
Burnley F.C. players
Newcastle United F.C. players
South Bank F.C. players
English Football League players